Idahome is an unincorporated community in Cassia County, Idaho, United States. The community was named by a railroad surveying party that found a bag labeled "Idahome Flour Co." at the site; the railroad made the place a stop with the flour company's name.

References

Unincorporated communities in Cassia County, Idaho
Unincorporated communities in Idaho